James Byrne (1 July 1820 – 23 October 1897) was a Church of Ireland priest in Ireland during the nineteenth century.

Byrne was born in County Carlow and educated at Trinity College, Dublin. He served incumbencies at Raymoghy, County Donegal and Cappagh, County Tyrone. He was Dean of Clonfert from 1866 until his death.

References

Deans of Clonfert
19th-century Irish Anglican priests
Alumni of Trinity College Dublin
1820 births
People from County Carlow
1897 deaths